Rafael Gil (22 May 1913 – 10 July 1986) was a Spanish film director and screenwriter.

His film La guerra de Dios (1953) won the Bronze Lion at the Venice Film Festival in 1953 and also won best film and best director at the San Sebastián International Film Festival. His film La noche del sábado (1950) was nominated for the Gold Lion at the 1950 Venice Film Festival and his film El beso de Judas (1954) was also nominated for the Gold Lion at the 1954 festival in Venice. His film Let's Make the Impossible! (1958) was nominated for the Golden Berlin Bear at the Berlin International Film Festival. He has won nine prizes of the National Syndicate of Spectacle of Spain.

Gil was a prominent director of the Franco era. His later works, often in collaboration with the Pro-Franco screenwriter and novelist Fernando Vizcaíno Casas, looked back nostalgically to the years of Franco's rule.

Filmography 
 The Queen's Flower Girl (1940)
The Man Who Wanted to Kill Himself (1941).
 Journey to Nowhere (1942) –script too--.
Traces of Light. (1943). –script too-
 Eloisa Is Under an Almond Tree (1943) –direction and script--
 The Nail (1944) -direction and script
 Lessons in Good Love (1944)
 The Phantom and Dona Juanita (1945) –direction and script
 Thirsty Land  (1945)
The Prodigal Woman (1946) –direction and script
 The Holy Queen (1947) ––direction and script
 Lady in Ermine (1947)
 The Faith (1947) –script only-
 Don Quixote (1947; U.S. release 1949) -–direction and script
 The Sunless Street (1948)
 Mare Nostrum (1948)
 Just Any Woman (1949)
 Apollo Theatre (1950)
 Saturday Night (1950)
 Our Lady of Fatima (1951)
 The Great Galeoto (1951)
 The Song of Sister Maria (1952)
 From Madrid to Heaven (1952) ––direction and script
I Was a Parish Priest. (1953)
 Judas' Kiss (1954)
 He Died Fifteen Years Ago (1954)
 The Cock Crow (1955)
 The Other Life of Captain Contreras (1955) ––direction and script--
 The Big Lie (1956)
 Miracle of the White Suit (1956)
 Let's Make the Impossible! (1958) -appeared in it and wrote the script-
 Luxury Cabin (1959) ––direction and script--
College Boarding House (1959)
 Litri and His Shadow (1960)
 Green Harvest (1961) –script-
 Darling (1961)  –script-
 You and Me Are Three (1962) ––direction and script--
 Queen of The Chantecler (1962)
 Rogelia (1962) –script-
 The Blackmailers (1963)
 Samba (1964)  –script-
 Currito of the Cross (1965)
 Pedrito de Andía's New Life (1965) ––direction and script--
 Road to Rocío (1966)
 He's My Man! (1966)
 Another's Wife (1967) ––direction and script--
 The Sailor with Golden Fists (1968)
 Fruit of Temptation (1968)
 A Decent Adultery  (1969)
 Blood in the Bullring  (1969)
 The Man Who Wanted to Kill Himself (1970)
 The Locket (1970)
 Nothing Less Than a Real Man (1972) ––direction and script--
 The Green Envelope (1971)
 The Doubt (1972)
 The Guerrilla (1973)
 The King is the Best Mayor (1974)
 Death's Newlyweds (1975)
 The Good Days Lost (1975)
 Forget the Drums (1975)
 The Legion Like Women (1976)
 Two Men and Two Women Amongst Them (1977)
 Father Cami's Wedding (1979) –script only-
 Spoiled Children (1980)
 And in the Third Year, He Rose Again (1980)
 Old Shirt to New Jacket (1982)
 The Autonomines (1984)
 The Cheerful Colsada Girls (1984)

References

Bibliography
 Mira, Alberto. Historical Dictionary of Spanish Cinema. Scarecrow Press, 2010.

External links 

 

1913 births
1986 deaths
Film directors from Madrid
Spanish male screenwriters
Writers from Madrid
20th-century Spanish screenwriters
20th-century Spanish male writers